XMS Capital Partners (XMS) is an American independent, privately owned, global financial services firm providing investment banking, asset management, and merchant banking services worldwide.

History
XMS Capital Partners was launched in August 2006 and has grown into a global, independent financial services firm providing investment banking, asset management, and merchant banking. It has offices in Chicago, London, and Dublin and strategic relationships in Germany, Japan, China, and India. It also has a strategic alliance with Headwall Partners for its expertise in the steel, metals, mining and building products industries.

Business units
XMS Capital Partners has three business units:  Investment Banking (including M&A Advisory and Capital Raising), Asset Management, and Merchant Banking.

Investment banking
XMS works with public and private companies including family-owned businesses. XMS has completed a wide range of domestic and international transactions across multiple industries: broad industrials, business services, automotive, paper and packaging, chemicals, consumer/food/beverage, healthcare, financial services, energy, agriculture, aerospace/defense, distribution/logistics/transport, education, retail/restaurants, tech/media/telecom, and sports.

Asset management
XA Investments LLC (XAI) is a Chicago-based firm founded by XMS in March 2016. XAI partners with established alternative asset managers including credit managers, hedge fund managers, and private debt and equity firms, among others.

XAI’s Alternative Registered Trust (ART) platform offers investments to individual and smaller institutional investors.

XAI is the registered funds division of XMS and offers securities through XMS, which is a member of FINRA and the SIPC.

Merchant banking

References

Banks based in Chicago
Financial services companies established in 2006
Banks established in 2006
Investment banks in the United States